Xohana Torres Fernández (22 November 1929 – 12 September 2017) was a Spanish writer, poet, playwright, and member of the Royal Galician Academy whose best known works included the novel, Adiós, María (1971), which won the Galician literary prize from the Galician Center of Buenos Aires, and Estación ao mar (1980). Torres was part of a generation of writers who championed Galician language and literature during the Francoist era at a time when regional languages were routinely suppressed.

Torres also directed Raíz e Tempo, the first cultural radio program broadcast exclusively in Galician. Examples of her works of children's literature include Polo mar van as sardiñas (1968) and Pericles e a balea (1984).

Torres was born in Santiago de Compostela on 22 November 1931. She died in Vigo, Galicia, Spain, on 12 September 2017, at the age of 85.

References

1929 births
2017 deaths
Galician-language writers
Galician poets
Writers from Galicia (Spain)
Women writers from Galicia (Spain)
Royal Galician Academy
Spanish dramatists and playwrights
Spanish women dramatists and playwrights
Spanish women poets
Spanish children's writers
Spanish women children's writers
People from Santiago de Compostela